Summit Camp, also Summit Station, is a year-round staffed research station near the apex of the Greenland ice sheet. The population of the station is typically five in wintertime and reaches a maximum of 38 in the summer. The station is operated by the United States National Science Foundation through the logistical-support contractor Battelle Arctic Research Operations (Battelle ARO). A permit from the Danish Polar Center under the auspices of the Home Rule Government of Greenland is required to visit the station.

Geography 
The station, however, is not part of the Sermersooq municipality but falls within the bounds of the Northeast Greenland National Park.

Summit Station consists of the Big House (communications and galley), Mobile Science Facility, Temporary Atmospheric Watch Observatory, Berthing Module, a combined garage and generator building, and storage buildings.

History 

Summit Station was originally established in April 1989 in support of the Greenland Ice Sheet Project Two (GISP2) deep ice coring effort. A ski-equipped C-130 from the New York Air National Guard performed an open snow landing near the site, bringing the put-in team consisting of Mark Twickler, Jay Klink, Michael Morrison, and two navigation specialists; Doug Roberts and Jim Normandeau who located the exact location chosen for the GISP2 drilling site, established a camp, and laid out the runway. Subsequent flights brought in additional materials and personnel needed to build the station. Two major structures were planned and built: The Big House, an insulated panel building (housing a galley, common space, and office), elevated to minimize snow drifts; and a geodesic drill dome to house the deep drill. Extensive under-snow trenches were also constructed to house the core handling, processing, and storage facilities. Many smaller Weatherport hut buildings and tents were also erected as storage and shop areas, as well as sleeping quarters. These were erected and taken down each season. On July 1, 1993, the bedrock was reached. Originally only occupied in the summer, the station has been staffed year-round since 2003, with a winter population of 4 to 5.

Climate 
The climate is classified as ice cap, with no month having a mean temperature exceeding . On 14 August 2021, it rained throughout the entire day at Summit Camp, marking the first time since recordkeeping began (1989) that rain had fallen in liquid form at Greenland's glacial summit.

Transport 
During the summer months, the station is accessed via Kangerlussuaq Airport with LC-130 Hercules aircraft which land on a  snow runway, which is prepared and regularly groomed for ski-equipped aircraft. Winter access is infrequent, using smaller, ski-equipped aircraft such as Twin Otter flown by Kenn Borek Air.

See also
List of research stations in the Arctic
NEEM Camp
Camp Century
Eismitte
North Ice
List of mountains in Greenland

References

External links 
Exploration history of northern East Greenland
Webcam of Summit Camp
Summit Camp Homepage
CH2M HILL Polar Services Homepage for Summit Station
Weather data of Summit Camp
Documenting 2013 journey to Summit Station
ESRL Global Monitoring Division - Summit Observatory
WeatherPort Shelter Systems

Research stations in Greenland